Voin Andreyevich Rimsky-Korsakov (1822–1871) was a Russian navigator, hydrographer and geographer. He was an elder brother of composer and conductor Nikolai Rimsky-Korsakov.

Rimsky-Korsakov was born in 1822 into a family of Russian nobility and graduated from the School for Mathematical and Navigational Sciences in Saint Petersburg. He served as a navy officer and commander of the schooner Vostok in the flotilla under the administration of Admiral Yevfimy Putyatin.

In the 1850s and 1860s Rimsky-Korsakov researched the area of the Sea of Japan near Ussuri Krai. Later a small archipelago was named after him.

Rimsky-Korsakov died at the age of 49 in 1871 in Pisa and was buried in Saint Petersburg.

Notes

External links
РИМСКИЙ-КОРСАКОВ Воин Андреевич 
Избранные биографии. Римский-Корсаков В.А. 

1822 births
1871 deaths
Scientists from Saint Petersburg
Primorsky Krai
Explorers  from Saint Petersburg
Geographers from the Russian Empire
Russian hydrographers
Imperial Russian Navy personnel